Ricaurte is a municipality and town of Colombia in the department of Cundinamarca. A law issued on 14 November  1857 created the Peñalisa District and December of the same year the name was changed to Ricaurte; in 1937 it was annexed to the Girardot municipality but it recovered its condition of municipality in 1968.

Other Facts 
 Market Day: Thursday and Sunday
 Distance from Bogotá: 142 km
 Foundation: 1813 like Peñalisa
 Created: Departamental Decree No. 409 of 11 March 1968
 Median temperature: 27 °C
 Demonym:
 Dane Code:

Veredas 
The Municipality of Ricaurte have 16 Veredas, 17 within the Urban Zone.  The Veredas are:

Callejón, Casablanca, Cumaca, El Paso, El Portal, La Carrera, La Tetilla, La Virginia, Las Veras, Llano del Pozo, Limoncito, Manuel Norte, Manuel Sur, Pto Peñalisa, San Francisco, San Martin and Zona Urbana

References

Municipalities of Cundinamarca Department
1857 establishments in the Republic of New Granada